Dr. W. Andreas Jacobs (born October 1963) is a Bremen-born entrepreneur who lives in Germany and is a German national.

Biography 
Andreas Jacobs (1963) studied law at the Universities of Freiburg im Breisgau, Munich and Montpellier and subsequently obtained a postgraduate degree in European competition law (Dr. iur.) from the University of Freiburg im Breisgau. Afterwards he obtained an MBA from INSEAD in Fontainebleau, France.

From 1991, Andreas Jacobs worked three years as a consultant and project manager at The Boston Consulting Group in Munich.
 
Since 1992, Andreas Jacobs has been an independent entrepreneur with a stake in several companies plus minority interests in several other companies.

Since 2000, Andreas Jacobs has been responsible for the family business in Switzerland. As from 2003, Andreas Jacobs served on the board of Barry Callebaut AG, where he was chairman from 2005 to 2016. He was executive chairman of Jacobs Holding AG from 2004 to 2015 and a member of the board until 2019. In April 2015, he stepped down from his functions at Adecco SA, where he had served as member of the board since May 2006, chairman of the Nomination & Compensation Committee since May 2008 and as vice-chairman of the board since January 2012.  Furthermore, he served as chairman of Infront Sports & Media AG (until 2011), and as chairman of Brach’s Inc. (from 2000 until 2004).

Andreas Jacobs serves as chairman of INSEAD – The Business School for the World®, Minibar AG and Röwer & Rüb GmbH. Furthermore, he is CEO of Niantic Holding GmbH, a member of the advisory board of Dr. August Oetker KG, member of the board of Louis Dreyfus Company Holdings, member of the board of Hoist Group Holding Intressenter AB, and member of the board of directors of various small private companies. In 2015, he was co-founder and investor of GENUI Partners, an investment company based in Germany, where he advises several investments.

In 2020, Andreas joined the board of directors of Hoist Group - provider of the widest range of hospitality technology.

Personal 

Jacobs is married and has four children.

1963 births
INSEAD alumni
Boston Consulting Group people
Chocolatiers
Living people
Ludwig Maximilian University of Munich alumni
University of Freiburg alumni